John Crichton-Stuart may refer to:

 John Crichton-Stuart, 2nd Marquess of Bute (1793–1848)
 John Crichton-Stuart, 3rd Marquess of Bute (1847–1900)
 John Crichton-Stuart, 4th Marquess of Bute (1881–1947)
 John Crichton-Stuart, 5th Marquess of Bute (1907–1956)
 John Crichton-Stuart, 6th Marquess of Bute (1933–1993)
 John Crichton-Stuart, 7th Marquess of Bute (1958–2021)